The State Merited Chorus and Symphony Orchestra of the Korean People's Army is the principal musical performing unit of the Korean People's Army (KPA), based in the North Korean capital city of Pyongyang. As the second oldest military chorus and instrumental ensemble (after the Song and Dance Ensemble of the Korean People's Army), it serves as one of the outstanding premier musical ensembles within the whole KPA proper and has been hailed as a model institution. It has been in existence since February 1947.

Brief history 
The ensemble was established on February 25, 1947 by orders of the founding Premier of the DPRK and Supreme Commander of the KPA, Kim Il-sung, as a subdivision of the General Political Bureau of the KPA's arts and culture section, and performed its first public concert on that day, which has been marked as its anniversary ever since.

The SMCSO-KPA has been one of the more experienced of the military arts ensembles of North Korea, having made appearances in many events concerning the KPA, the Workers' Party of Korea (WPK) and the nation at large. During the Korean War, musicians and singers of the Chorus performed at the front lines before servicemen and women of the KPA, and many were decorated with state orders and decorations for valorous participation in the war effort. Postwar, it became one of the premier musical ensembles of the growing nation, and attention was given to its performances that featured songs praising the leadership of the country and helped in the propagation of the cult of personality of the state, the importance of Juche, economic progress and of national defense against the United States and its allies, and the building of a socialist future for the country and the world. Through its seven decades of existence the Chorus was also privileged to perform before many foreign heads of state and government in their state visits to the country.

In the mid-1990s up to his death in 2011, Kim Jong-il, in his capacity as Supreme Commander, attended many of its holiday and special concerts and made the Chorus a model musical group as part of the campaigns to strengthen the Songun ideology of the KPA and as an ambassador of North Korean music to the world. Many of his appearances in its concerts inspired the ensemble's musicians and singers to work harder to fulfill the tasks set by the Party and the KPA to provide the people with revolutionary-styled songs that portray the country as one that is strong, prosperous and independent, led by the Supreme Leaders, guided by the WPK in its pursuit of living the national ideology and defended to the last by the men and women of the People's Army, the armed forces guided by the Songun political ideology. Also, the Chorus made music videos shown daily on Korean Central Television of many of its best compositions, with the rise of pro-DPRK channels on social media sites like YouTube in the mid-2000s, the videos of their songs exposed the men of the ensemble and its symphonic orchestra to online viewers outside the country (except in South Korea, where such videos have been banned). In the late 2000s the Chorus began its series of collaboration concerts then with the now defunct Unhasu Orchestra, the Samjiyon Band and Orchestra, and the State Symphony Orchestra, in an effort to update its musical selections, in 2013 it continued on its collaboration concerts, this time, with the Moranbong Band and the Chongbong Band, alongside the Symphony Orchestra of the State Affairs Commission, appearing occasionally.

Kim Jong-un's administration saw the modernization of the ensemble and of its instrumentation to keep up with the times and formally included women soloists and instrumentalists beginning in 2014 as it transitioned into a dynamic musical group and the KPA's flagship ensemble, adopting pop-styled music in addition to its usual classical, ideological and patriotic music compositions performed in its concert schedules, some of which he attended personally in his capacity as Supreme Leader of the Republic and Supreme Commander of the KPA. To mark the 70th year of the WPK in 2015, the Chorus, as part of the "Songs Full of Memories" concert series (February–March), also performed with musicians from both the Pochonbo Electronic Ensemble and the Wangjaesan Light Music Band. In 2019, it gained a permanent home at the WPK Central Committee Annex Building in Pyongyang, following years of performing in major concert halls in the capital, using a new set of white dress uniforms (debuted 2018), which are used occasionally with the new styled khaki uniforms, used since 2015 in concert performances.

It began performing overseas after many years in September 2015, when it performed in Moscow to mark the 70th anniversary of the Allied victory in the Pacific, followed by an impressive performance in January 2019, when it performed at the National Concert Hall in Beijing, China.

On June 21, 2019, the Chorus and Symphony Orchestra played in the formal reopening night of the 2019 Arirang Mass Games "People's Country" at Pyongyang's Rungrado 1st of May Stadium in the presence of both Kim Jong-un and the General Secretary of the Communist Party of China, Xi Jinping. It was the first time the Chorus played in the venue, alongside the Samjiyon Band and Orchestra, which also performed as well.

See also 
 Music of North Korea
 Republic of Korea Army Band

References 

Korean military bands
Military units and formations of North Korea
1947 establishments in North Korea
North Korean orchestras
Military units and formations established in 1947